James Warren Dean Jr. is the current  president of the University of New Hampshire since June 30, 2018. Dean earned his Ph.D. and master’s degrees in organizational behavior from Carnegie Mellon University, as well as a Bachelor’s degree in Psychology from Catholic University Of America.

Personal life

Dean and his wife, Jan, have two daughters and four grandchildren.

Early life
Dean graduated from the Catholic University of America, where he earned a bachelor's degree. He subsequently earned a PhD from Carnegie Mellon University.

Career
Dean was professor of Organizational Behavior at the University of North Carolina at Chapel Hill's Kenan–Flagler Business School, and served as the school's dean from 2008 from 2013. He was also UNC's executive vice chancellor and provost. As provost, he led a number of efforts to support student success, worked to enhance retention and graduation rates, and reorganized resources to better prepare students for life and success after college. Dean also helped to lead a transition toward a new university wide budget model.

Prior to serving as provost, Dean served as the dean of the UNC Kenan–Flagler Business School, where he launched an online MBA program that increased revenue by millions of dollars. His work in the business school started shortly after he joined the faculty at UNC in 1997, when he was asked to lead the Kenan-Flagler Business School's flagship MBA program. As associate dean for executive education, Dean recruited new clients, including the United States Navy and the United States Air Force, and increased revenue by 60 percent.

Dean succeeded Mark Huddleston as the 20th president of the University of New Hampshire on June 30, 2018.

An Excerpt of Dean’s statement on being named 20th President of UNH:

“I am deeply honored to have the opportunity to serve as president of UNH at a time when all public universities need to rethink our efforts to support the public through teaching, research and engagement. The university has accomplished so much already in the classroom, the laboratory, and the community, and it is well-positioned to strengthen and even to redefine its role as a leading public research university.”

- James W. Dean Jr.

References

External links
Full list of University Presidents (including interim Presidents) , University of New Hampshire Library

Living people
Catholic University of America alumni
Carnegie Mellon University alumni
University of North Carolina at Chapel Hill faculty
Business school deans
Presidents of the University of New Hampshire
1956 births